The 2008 Vattenfall Cyclassics road cycling race took place on September 7, 2008 in Hamburg, Germany and saw an all-Australian podium with Robbie McEwen of  beating Mark Renshaw of  and Allan Davis of .

Results

See also
 2008 in Road Cycling

Vattenfall Cyclassics
Vattenfall Cyclassics
2008